Christopher James Hovan (born May 12, 1978) is a former American football defensive tackle. He played college football at Boston College, and was a National Football League (NFL) defensive tackle from 2000 to 2010. He was drafted by the Minnesota Vikings in the first round of 2000 NFL Draft.

Hovan also played for the Tampa Bay Buccaneers and St. Louis Rams.

Early years
Hovan grew up in Rocky River, Ohio, a suburb of Cleveland.  played his high school football at St. Ignatius High School in Cleveland. During his career he earned many honors and awards including an honorable mention All-American by USA Today, and All-City and All-State by The Plain Dealer. He finished his high school career with a school record 28 career sacks. He also played lacrosse, earning All-State  recognition.

College career
Hovan played his college football at Boston College. As a senior, he was an All-American and was a semi-finalist for the Lombardi Award. He also became the first player in Boston College history to be named All-Big East three times. He finished his career starting 43 of 45 games, recording 20.5 sacks.

Professional career

Minnesota Vikings
Hovan was drafted by the Minnesota Vikings with the 25th overall pick in the 2000 NFL Draft. He would go on to play five years for the Vikings, playing in 77 games, recording 192 tackles and 17 sacks.

Tampa Bay Buccaneers
On April 1, 2005, Hovan signed with the Tampa Bay Buccaneers. He had a good first season with the Bucs, helping them win the NFC South and finish as the number one ranked defense. Hovan was released on April 26, 2010.

St. Louis Rams
On June 9, 2010, Hovan signed with the St. Louis Rams. On August 6, 2010, Hovan was placed on injured reserve due to a back injury, ending his 2010 season.

Coaching 
Hovan was named assistant strength & conditioning coach for the South Florida Bulls in 2011.

Hovan was signed by the Montreal Alouettes of the Canadian Football League as their defensive line coach on January 9, 2013. He was the defensive line coach for the Tampa Bay Storm of the AFL for the 2013 season.

Hovan coached in the AFL with the Tampa Bay Storm for 3 seasons.

2017-2018: Hovan is currently in his second year coaching high school varsity football.  
He is the co-defensive coordinator for the Warriors football team at Steinbrenner High School in Lutz, FL.

NFL statistics

References

External links
NFL.com stats
St. Louis Rams' bio
ESPN stats
Pro-Football-Reference stats

1978 births
Living people
People from Rocky River, Ohio
Players of American football from Ohio
Saint Ignatius High School (Cleveland) alumni
American football defensive tackles
Boston College Eagles football players
Minnesota Vikings players
Tampa Bay Buccaneers players
St. Louis Rams players
Tampa Bay Storm coaches
Sportspeople from Cuyahoga County, Ohio